UL16 binding protein 1 (ULBP1) is a cell surface glycoprotein encoded by ULBP1 gene located on the chromosome 6. ULBP1 is related to MHC class I molecules, but its gene maps outside the MHC locus. The domain structure of ULBP1 differs significantly from those of conventional MHC class I molecules. It does not contain the α3 domain and the transmembrane segment. ULBP1 is thus composed of only the α1α2 domain which is linked to the cell membrane by the GPI anchor. It functions as a stress-induced ligand for NKG2D receptor. ULBP1 is, for example, upregulated during HCMV infection. Binding of HCMV-encoded UL16 glycoprotein to ULBP1 interferes with cell surface localization of ULBP1; this represents another mechanism by which HCMV-infected cells might escape the immune system.

References

Further reading